Ronald Kray (24 October 193317 March 1995) and Reginald Kray (24 October 19331 October 2000) were identical twin brothers, gangsters and murderers. They were the foremost perpetrators of organised crime in the East End of London, England, from the late 1950s to 1967. With their gang, known as the Firm, the Kray twins were involved in murder, armed robbery, arson, protection rackets, gambling, and assaults.

In the 1960s, as West End nightclub owners, the Kray twins mixed with politicians and prominent entertainers such as Diana Dors, Frank Sinatra and Judy Garland. They became celebrities themselves, were photographed by David Bailey and interviewed on television.

The Kray twins were arrested on 8 May 1968 and convicted in 1969 as a result of the efforts of detectives led by Detective Superintendent Leonard "Nipper" Read. Each was sentenced to life imprisonment. Ronnie was committed to Broadmoor Hospital in 1979 and remained there until his death on 17 March 1995 from a heart attack; Reggie was released from prison on compassionate grounds in August 2000, five weeks before he died of bladder cancer.

Early life 
Ronald and Reginald Kray were born on 24 October 1933 in Haggerston, East London, to Charles David Kray (1907–1983), a wardrobe dealer, and Violet Annie Lee (1909–1982). The brothers were identical twins, with Reggie born 10 minutes before Ronnie. Their parents already had a six-year-old son, Charles James (1927–2000). A sister, Violet (born 1929), died in infancy. When the twins were three years old, they contracted diphtheria. The Kray household was dominated by their mother, who remained the most important influence on them during their childhood. Their father, Charles Kray Sr., was a rag-and-bone man with a fondness for heavy drinking. Kray Sr.'s work led him to live a semi-nomadic lifestyle as he travelled all over southern England looking for junk to sell, and even when he was in London, he was more often seen at the pubs than at home with his family. The Kray twins first attended Wood Close School in Brick Lane, and then Daniel Street School, Bethnal Green. In 1938 the family moved from Stean Street in Haggerston to 178 Vallance Road in Bethnal Green.

Violet Kray was regarded as a minor celebrity in Bethnal Green for giving birth to and raising a healthy pair of twins at a time when the infant and childhood mortality rate was high amongst the British working class. In the interwar period, it was normal that one of the twins born into working class families would die before adulthood, and it was most unusual that both the Kray twins survived, making Violet Kray the object of much admiration in Bethnal Green, which caused her to have an inflated ego. There was a feeling within Bethnal Green that there was an almost unnatural emotional closeness between the two twins and their mother, who shunned the company of others. Ronnie later stated about his childhood: "We had our mother, and we had each other, so we never needed no one else". One of the Krays' cousins who attended school with them, Billy Wilshire, recalled: "It's hard to say exactly what it was, but they weren't like other children". The biographer of the Krays, John Pearson, argued that Violet Kray planted the seeds of the malignant narcissism that the twins would display as adults by encouraging her sons to think of themselves as being extraordinary while spoiling their every whim.

In World War Two, Kray Sr. was a deserter from the British Army, having been conscripted in September 1939, and deserting shortly afterwards as he found the life of a soldier uncongenial. Kray Sr. spent the next 15 years living as a fugitive, being finally arrested in 1954 on charges of desertion, and during this period as a wanted man, he was only irregularly involved in raising his family. During the Second World War, the twins were evacuated to East House in Hadleigh, Suffolk, with their mother Violet and their older brother Charles. They stayed at East House with the owners Dr and Mrs Style for about one year before moving back to London, as Violet missed her friends and family. While they were in Hadleigh, the twins attended Bridge Street Boys' School. When the twins were interviewed in 1989 while at Broadmoor Hospital, Ronnie described Hadleigh as their first time in the countryside. What appealed to the twins was the "quietness, the peacefulness of it, the fresh air, nice scenery, nice countryside – different from London. We used to go to a big 'ill called Constitution Hill and used to go sledging there in the winter-time."

The influence of their maternal grandfather, Jimmy "Cannonball" Lee, caused the brothers to take up amateur boxing, then a popular pastime for working-class boys in the East End. Sibling rivalry spurred them on, and both achieved some success. Ronnie was considered to be the more aggressive of the two twins, constantly getting into street fights as a teenager. The British scholar Jonathan Raban wrote that Ronnie had a "low IQ", but that he was an avid reader who especially liked books about T.E. Lawrence, Orde Wingate, Al Capone and the Chicago underworld in the "Roaring Twenties". Raban attributed much of Ronnie's "savage petulance" as a teenager due to his rage over having to hide his bisexual tendencies.

Military service 
The Krays were called up to do National Service in the British Army in March 1952. Although the pair reported to the depot of the Royal Fusiliers at the Tower of London, they attempted to leave after only a few minutes. When the corporal in charge tried to stop them, he was seriously injured by Ronnie when he punched him on the jaw. The Krays walked back to their East End home. They were arrested the next morning by the police and turned over to the army.

In September, while absent without leave (AWOL) again, the twins assaulted a police constable who tried to arrest them. They became among the last prisoners to be held at the Tower of London before being transferred to Shepton Mallet military prison in Somerset for a month to await court-martial. After they were convicted, both were sent to the Buffs' Home Counties Brigade Depot jail in Canterbury, Kent. However, when it became clear they were both to be dishonourably discharged from the army, the Krays' behaviour became worse. They dominated the exercise areas outside their one-man cells, threw tantrums, emptied a latrine bucket over a sergeant, dumped a canteen full of hot tea on another guard, handcuffed a guard to their prison bars with a pair of stolen cuffs and set their bedding on fire. Eventually they were moved to a communal cell where they assaulted their guard with a vase and escaped. After being quickly recaptured, they spent their last night in military custody in Canterbury drinking cider, eating crisps and smoking cigarillos courtesy of the young national servicemen acting as their guards. The next day the Krays were transferred to a civilian prison to serve sentences for the crimes they committed while AWOL. Raban wrote that prison psychiatrists who examined Ronnie found him to be: "educationally subnormal, psychopathic, schizophrenic and insane". Despite a less than stellar military career, the Krays adopted an extremely militaristic style as Ronnie took to calling himself "the Colonel" while their home at 178 Vallance Road was dubbed "Fort Vallance".

Criminal careers

Nightclub owners 
The Krays' criminal records and dishonourable discharges from the Royal Fusiliers ended their boxing careers, and the brothers turned to crime full-time. They bought a run-down snooker club in Mile End where they started several protection rackets. By the end of the 1950s, the Krays were working for Jay Murray from Liverpool and were involved in hijacking, armed robbery, and arson, through which they acquired other clubs and properties. In 1960, Ronnie was imprisoned for 18 months for running a protection racket. While he was in prison, Peter Rachman, head of a landlord operation, sold Reggie a nightclub called Esmeralda's Barn to ward off threats of further extortion. The location is where the Berkeley Hotel now stands.

Ownership of Esmeralda's Barn increased the Krays' influence in the West End by making them celebrities as well as criminals. The twins adopted a norm according to which anyone who failed to show due respect would be severely punished. Both Ronnie and Reggie notoriously laundered money through dog and horse tracks as well as through businesses, which led to several others being investigated during the mid-1960s for their co-operation with the crimes. They were assisted by a banker named Alan Cooper who wanted protection against the Krays' rivals, the Richardson Gang, based in South London. Raban called Ronnie the "dimmer" of the two twins, writing that he was "...a man whose grasp on reality was so slight and pathologically deranged that he was able to live out a crude, primarily coloured fiction, twisting the city into the shape of a bad thriller". Ronnie quite consciously modelled the style of "the Firm" after what he read about the Chicago underworld, for an example having his own personal barber visit his flat to work on his hair because he read somewhere that was the normal practice with Chicago gangsters in the 1920s.

Celebrity status 
In the 1960s, the Kray twins were widely seen as prosperous and charming celebrity nightclub owners and were part of the Swinging London scene. A large part of their fame was due to their non-criminal activities as popular figures on the celebrity circuit, being photographed by David Bailey on more than one occasion and socialising with lords, MPs, socialites and show business characters, including Frank Sinatra, Peter Sellers, Joan Collins, Judy Garland, Diana Dors, George Raft, Sammy Davis Jr., Shirley Bassey, Liza Minnelli, Cliff Richard, Dusty Springfield, Jayne Mansfield, Richard Harris, Danny La Rue and Barbara Windsor.

They were the best years of our lives. They called them the swinging sixties. The Beatles and the Rolling Stones were rulers of pop music, Carnaby Street ruled the fashion world... and me and my brother ruled London. We were fucking untouchable...
– Ronnie Kray, in his autobiography My Story

Part of the Krays celebrity status in the 1960s was due to the widespread perception that the twins were men who had risen out of poverty into positions of great wealth and power due to their own efforts. The Krays were seen as an example, albeit a perverse one, of the "meritocracy" that was to replace the traditional class system.  Furthermore, the 1960s were a time when many traditional British values were being questioned, and the Kray twins were widely seen as "rebels" against what were perceived as sanctimonious and hypocritical traditional British values. The scholars Chris Jenks and Justin Lorentzen wrote that there was "a popular mistrust of the Establishment" in the 1960s and that as many young people "laughed Prime Minister Macmillan and President Johnson, their teachers and university lecturers and priests and moralists off the stage", the Krays were seen as folk heroes. The "Swinging Sixties" era was a time of intense debates arising about consumerism, social mobility, sexuality, style, and social tolerance, and the Krays were involved in all of them as symbols, either bad or good, about the changes taking place in British society.

The Krays greatly valued their image and cultivated the media by inviting journalists to take photographs of them with other celebrities at nightclubs or in donating to charity. The Krays went about in an obsessive way managing and promoting their image that they wanted, namely as society's benefactors who gave generously to charity and as men who had risen up from poverty to become rich and powerful. The sociologist Dick Hebdige wrote that the Krays had: "...a sophisticated awareness of the importance of public relations matched only in the image-conscious field of American politics...As we have seen, certain of the Krays projects, when closely examined, take on a bizarre aspect more appropriate to the theater than to the rational pursuit of profit by crime". In 1960, gambling in clubs was legalised in the United Kingdom, which for the first time allowed 'decent' people to be openly seen gambling outside of the horserace tracks. The Krays were the owners of four nightclubs where gambling was allowed, which not only allowed them to be seen as successful businessmen, but also to socialise with the 'decent' people who would had previously shunned at least in public the company of gangsters running a "gambling den".

The Krays made a point of promoting a "gangster chic" image as both dressed in a style that countless films had associated with gangsters, namely wearing "discreet, dark, double-breasted suits with tight-knotted ties and shoulder-padded overcoats. Combined with garish jewellery such as large gold rings, gold bracelet watches, and diamond cuff links, the Krays conveyed a redoubtable image". The British scholar Ruth Penfold-Mounce described the Krays as a classic example of the social bandit, criminals who became folk heroes because of the belief that they were standing up to a corrupt Establishment while also paradoxically being seen as upholding the better part of society's values. The Krays were viewed in certain quarters as "Robin Hood" type criminals whose crimes were seen as acceptable. Penfold-Mounce noted they combined an air of menace and violence together with an image  of "a romanticised air of heroic gentlemanliness, generosity, and the apparent reinforcement of traditional social order parameters of conservatism and restraint". Within this context, the Krays made a point of stressing that there were limits to the values that they were willing to violate while promoting the image of themselves as the benefactors of society. For an example, the Krays made a great point of stressing the image of being respectful towards women as they knew that the British public did not like men who were disrespectful towards women. One former member of "the Firm", Tony Lambrianou stated that the positive image of the Krays was a "myth" as he maintained the only people the brothers ever cared about were themselves.

Jenks and Loretzen noted the image of the Krays had little to do with who the brothers actually were as they described the Krays as considerably more vicious and selfish than the popular "folk hero" image of them would allow. Admirers of the brothers stress their supposed "Robin Hood" characteristics with the brothers alleged to have given away much of their ill-gotten wealth to the deserving poor of the East End; their respect for women; and as a force for order who engaged only what were considered socially acceptable crimes such as theft while punishing those who engaged in what were considered socially unacceptable crimes such as rape. The East End at the time had its own informal rules such as a deep distrust of the Scotland Yard as exemplified by the popular saying "thou shalt not grass", which led to the police complaining of a "wall of silence". Within the East End, where "roguery" was widely admired, Jenks and Lorentzen noted "...symbolic heroes are elected through excess. The most audacious thefts, the most sadistic violence and an almost philosophical quest for glory in infamy are topmost in people's minds. An elision of style and brutality can emerge, as it did in the form of the Krays".

Conversely, the Kray twins were seen in other quarters as symbols of moral decay and evil, with the famous photographs of the two brothers taken by David Bailey being viewed as "the phrenological archetypes of proletarian villainy". Jenks and Lorentzen wrote the Krays became symbols in the public mind of British organised crime itself as the Krays were associated with "tales of excessive and gratuitous violence and to a time when London criminality appeared not only as organised as never before, but also integrated into the Establishment and the vanguard of popular culture". Jenks and Lorentzen further maintained that the Krays' close association with the East End of London, an area viewed as a centre of "social disorganisation and moral decay" further contributed to the negative picture of the brothers. At least some critics of the Krays made xenophobic arguments that the Krays were not of English stock, but were instead the products of a mixture of Ashkenazi Jewish and Romany descent, which was presented as typical of the East End, which was viewed in certain quarters as a "frontier", an impoverished and lawless area that attracted many immigrants. There is no evidence of the supposed Jewish/Romany origins of the Krays, a claim that seems to have been made only to associate the Krays with their supposed familial homelands in Eastern Europe and to distance them from English society. Finally, Jenks and Lorentzen argued that the rareness of identical twins made the brothers seem especially malevolent, giving them the "freak show" image as many found viewing two men who looked and sounded precisely the same to be disturbing and unnerving.

The closeness of the Krays made them seem sinister as Lambrianou recalled in 1995: "You were never, ever on solid ground with them...They played a little game of their own. There was an unspoken language; it was what they didn't say as much as what they did say. There's a myth that the Krays took care of their own, but I never saw it. The Krays were their own". Alongside this "freak show" image were suggestions of what was viewed at the time as perverted sexuality. At a time when homosexuality was widely considered abnormal – especially in the underworld of the East End – Ronnie made a point of flaunting his homosexual relationships, which was considered to be quite shocking in the 1950s–1960s. Reggie was ostensibly heterosexual, but there were rumours that he had boyfriends as a teenager. Alongside these rumours were the facts that he had only one known relationship with a woman, was only briefly married, and his marriage was apparently never consummated, which all led to a widespread belief that he was also gay. The Krays were not asexual, but the indeterminate nature of their sexuality contributed to their popular image of being in some vague way very perverse. The fact that the Krays were successful gangsters while not subscribing to the standard heteronormative "hard men" or "lovable rogue" stereotypes associated with British gangsters while also rejecting the popular effeminate stereotype of gay men led to a sense there was something unnatural about the Krays. The "sordid facts" that were presented during the Krays' trial for murder in 1968–1969 led to their "folk hero" image being eclipsed by a "folk villain" image.

Lord Boothby and Tom Driberg 
The Labour MP, Tom Driberg, who also served as the gossip columnist for The Daily Express newspaper knew the Conservative peer Lord Boothby very well through the dinner parties hosted by Lord Beaverbrook, the proprietor of The Daily Express. Through his friend, the theatre director Joan Littlewood, Driberg had met Reggie. Through their mutual friendship, he introduced Ronnie to Boothby. Ronnie was a sexual sadist while Boothby was a masochist who enjoyed the way that he was dominated by Ronnie. Boothby loved the limelight, and he used the fame that he had garnered from being Churchill's parliamentary secretary to often appear on television talks shows in the 1950s-1960s as the designated spokesman for the Conservative Party on the issues of the day. Boothby's career had been marred by scandal as his cousin, Simon Carey, noted: "Bob found it very, very difficult to tell the truth". However, this aspect of his life was unknown to the general public, who knew Boothby as a celebrity peer who was constantly on the talk shows. Boothby's status as the unofficial Tory television champion would make any scandal involving him especially damaging to the Conservative Party. For the purposes of blackmail and the sense of power that came from associating with powerful men, Ronnie hosted parties for Boothby and other upper-class gay men where attractive working class "rent boys" were made available for sex.  
 
In July 1964 an exposé in the tabloid newspaper Sunday Mirror insinuated that Ronnie had begun a homosexual relationship with Lord Boothby, a Conservative politician, at a time when sex between men was still a criminal offence in the UK. Scotland Yard had leaked to the Sunday Mirror several photographs featuring Ronnie and Boothby posing together along with photographs of them with Boothby's chauffeur Leslie Holt and Teddy Smith, a member of "the Firm" who was also the lover of Driberg. The photographs were not printed, but alluded to in the Sunday Mirror'''s headline "The Pictures We Must Not Print" along with the subtitle "Peer and Gangster: Yard Inquiry". Although no names were printed in the piece, the twins threatened the journalists involved and Boothby threatened to sue the newspaper with the help of Labour Party leader Harold Wilson's solicitor, Arnold Goodman. In the face of this, the Sunday Mirror backed down, sacking its editor, printing an apology and paying Boothby £40,000 in an out-of-court settlement. Because of this, other newspapers were unwilling to expose the Krays' connections and criminal activities. Decades later, Channel 4 established the truth of the allegations and released a documentary on the subject called The Gangster and the Pervert Peer (2009).

Boothby called the £40,000 pounds (close to a million pounds in 2010 values) he was awarded from The Sunday Mirror "tainted money", and though he professed to have donated the majority of the money to charity, it appears the Krays took the bulk of the £40,000 pounds. One of Boothby's first actions after being awarded the libel suit was to write a cheque for £5,000 pounds to Ronnie. Ronnie had also launched a libel action of his own against The Sunday Mirror columnist Cecil King for calling him a "homosexual thug" in one of his columns, but the judge dismissed the suit under the grounds that it was a "fair comment". Ronnie was furious about the dismissal, raging to a group of journalists: "Proves what I always said. One law for the fucking rich and another for the poor".

Police investigated the Krays on several occasions, but the brothers' reputation for violence made witnesses afraid to testify. There was also a problem for both main political parties. The Conservative Party was unwilling to press the police to end the Krays' power for fear that the Boothby connection would again be publicised, and the Labour Party, in power from October 1964 but with an extremely thin majority in the House of Commons and the prospect of another general election needing to be called in the very near future, did not want connections between Ronnie and Tom Driberg, a relatively openly gay Labour MP, to get into the public realm.

Alliance with the American Mafia
The Kray brothers formed an alliance with "the Commission" of New York that was the governing board of the American Mafia, being in contact with Meyer Lansky and Angelo Bruno, who were looking to invest in London's gambling clubs and nightclubs. The Mafia favoured nightclubs and casinos for money laundering, and greatly preferred nightclubs and casinos abroad as a way to avoid hostile audits by the American authorities. The nightclubs and casinos of Havana had long served that purpose, but after the Communist revolution of 1959 led to their closure, the Mafia had been looking for a replacement, leading to interest in London's nightclubs. The belief that the Krays were able to blackmail elite figures such as Boothby and in this way influence the British government made them attractive London business partners for the Mafia. Both Lansky and Bruno were considered to be diplomatic figures by the standards of American organised crime, and were felt to be the best ones to negotiate with the mercurial and irascible Krays.

The conduit between Lansky and the Krays was a faded Hollywood star living in London, the actor George Raft, whom the Krays idolised for his performance as the ice-cold Mafia hitman Guino Rinaldo in the 1932 film Scarface. The Mob-linked Raft had been a major Hollywood star in the 1930s-1940s, but his career had been in decline all through the 1950s. In 1965 with Raft's Hollywood career essentially over, he moved to London with the hope that might find roles in European films. Lansky had opened the Colony Sports Club in London and installed Raft as the nominal owner, partly to avoid the attention of the British authorities and partly to gain the attention of gamblers, who might be attracted by the lingering stardom of Raft. The Colony Sports Club was marketed not so much at British gamblers, but rather at older, wealthy American tourists in London. The Krays were hired to provide "protection" at the Colony Sports Club, being paid £500 pounds per week to provide thugs from "the Firm" to act as security at the Colony Sports Club. Ronnie in particular had a fixation with the Mafia and was overjoyed to meet Mafiosi such as Dino Cellini and Angelo Bruno.

In 1964 Ronnie flew out to New York to meet Lansky and Bruno, but the meeting was aborted when U.S. Immigration refused him admission under the grounds that he had a criminal record. In 1965, a branch of the Royal Bank of Canada was robbed in Montreal, and the thieves stole bearer bonds worth $50,000 Canadian dollars. Altogether, about $1 million in Canadian bearer bonds had been stolen in various robberies in Montreal.  In the 1960s-1970s, Montreal was known as the "bank robbery capital of North America" as the city had more bank robberies than any other North American city. The Montreal underworld is very closely linked to the New York underworld, and as such "the Commission" took an interest in the bonds. The Cotroni family, which was the dominant criminal syndicate in Montreal in the 1960s was merely the Canadian branch of the Bonanno family of New York, which was one of the "Five Families" whose leaders made up "the Commission". As the police in both Canada and the United States were on the look-out for the stolen bearer bonds, it was decided to sell them in Britain and the task was entrusted to the Krays. The Krays sent over a corrupt businessman, Leslie "the Brain" Payne, to Montreal to pick up the stolen bonds to sell them in the United Kingdom. Payne was able to cash the stolen bonds at a London broking house via a friend who proved all too willing not to ask questions about their precise provenance, netting a handsome profit for "the Firm". The success of the stolen bearer bonds deal made the Krays into the preferred British partners of the American Mafia, who used the Krays a number of times afterwards in similar arrangements.

The business of redeeming the stolen bearer bonds in London ultimately led to a break between Payne and the Krays. Payne charged that since he was the one taking all the risks as he flew out to Montreal to pick up the bonds, smuggled them into London and had them redeemed via his corrupt friends in the City that he was entitled to a larger share of the profits. The Krays refused Payne's demand, which caused him to leave "the Firm" out of disgust with their greed. Payne did not contact the authorities, but the mere possibility that Payne might one day turn Crown's evidence and testify against the Krays led them to plot his murder. The Second World War veteran Payne who had fought in the Battles of Monte Cassino in 1944 ridiculed the threats of the Krays as he maintained that he had seen far worse at Monte Cassino, which made the Krays wanted to have him killed even more.     The Krays lacked the necessary connections with the City to keep redeeming the stolen bonds on their own and the replacement for Payne was Alan Bruce Cooper, a disreputable American businessman living in London who appeared to be a fantasist as he often made outlandish claims about himself.

 George Cornell 

Ronnie shot and killed George Cornell, a member of the Richardson Gang, at the Blind Beggar pub in Whitechapel on 9 March 1966. The day before, there had been a shoot-out at Mr Smith's, a nightclub in Catford, involving the Richardsons and Richard Hart, an associate of the Krays, who was shot dead. This public shoot-out led to the arrest of nearly all the Richardson Gang. Cornell, by chance, was not present at the club during the shooting and was not arrested.

Ronnie was drinking in another pub when he learned of Cornell's whereabouts. He went to the Blind Beggar with his driver, "Scotch Jack" John Dickson, and his assistant Ian Barrie. Ronnie went into the pub with Barrie, walked straight to Cornell and shot him in the head in public view. Barrie, confused by what happened, fired five shots in the air warning onlookers not to report what had happened to the police. Just before he was shot, Cornell remarked, "Well, look who's here." He died at 3:30a.m. in hospital. Ronnie was already suffering from paranoid schizophrenia at the time of the killing.

According to some sources, Ronnie killed Cornell because he referred to him as a "fat poof" (a derogatory term for gay men) during a confrontation between the Krays and the Richardsons at the Astor Club on Christmas Day 1965. Richardson member Frankie Fraser was tried for the murder of Hart at Mr. Smith's, but was found not guilty. Richardson member Ray "the Belgian" Cullinane testified that he saw Cornell kicking Hart. Witnesses would not co-operate with the police in the murder case due to intimidation and the trial ended inconclusively without pointing to any suspect in particular. In his 1988 memoir, Ronnie wrote: "I felt fucking marvellous. I have never felt so good, so bloody alive, before or since. Twenty years on and I can recall every second of the killing of George Cornell. I have replayed it in my mind millions of times".

The Krays' Mafia allies were unhappy about the Cornell murder, feeling that it was reckless on the part of Ronnie to commit a murder in public, instead of assigning the task to some junior associate. Reggie was able with the help of Raft to maintain the alliance, arguing "the Firm" was still the best business partners of the Mafia in London. Raft and Reggie used the fact that none of the witnesses at the Blind Beggar were willing to testify against Ronnie as evidence of the degree of fear that the Krays inspired. Shortly afterwards, Raft was prevented from returning to Britain following a trip back to the United States by a Home Office order as an "undesirable", thereby costing the Krays their strongest ally within the Mafia.

 Frank Mitchell 
On 12 December 1966, the Krays helped Frank Mitchell, "the Mad Axeman", to escape from Dartmoor Prison. Ronnie had befriended Mitchell while they served time together in Wandsworth Prison. Mitchell felt that the authorities should review his case for parole, so Ronnie thought that he would be doing him a favour by getting him out of Dartmoor, highlighting his case in the media and forcing the authorities to act.  Once Mitchell had escaped, the Krays held him at a friend's flat in Barking Road, East Ham. He was a large man with a mental disorder, and he was difficult to control. He disappeared, but the Krays were acquitted of his murder. Freddie Foreman, a friend of the Krays, claimed in his autobiography Respect that he shot Mitchell dead as a favour to the twins and disposed of his body at sea.

 Jack "the Hat" McVitie 
In October 1967, four months after the suicide of his wife Frances, Reggie was allegedly encouraged by his brother to kill Jack "the Hat" McVitie, a minor member of the Kray gang who had failed to fulfil a £1,000 contract, £500 of which had been paid to him in advance, to kill their former financial adviser, Leslie Payne. McVitie was lured to a basement flat in Evering Road, Stoke Newington, on the pretence of a party. Upon entering the premises, he saw Ronnie seated in the front room. Ronnie approached, letting loose a barrage of verbal abuse and cutting McVitie below his eye with a piece of broken glass. It is believed that an argument then broke out between the twins and McVitie. As the argument got more heated, Reggie pointed a handgun at McVitie's head and pulled the trigger twice, but the gun failed to discharge.

McVitie was then held in a bear hug by the twins' cousin, Ronnie Hart, and Reggie was handed a carving knife. He then stabbed McVitie in the face and stomach, driving the blade into his neck while twisting the knife, not stopping even as McVitie lay on the floor dying. Reggie had committed a very public murder, against someone who many members of the Firm felt did not deserve to die. In an interview in 2000, shortly after Reggie's death, Freddie Foreman revealed that McVitie had a reputation for leaving carnage behind him due to his habitual consumption of drugs and heavy drinking, and his having threatened to harm the twins and their family.

Tony and Chris Lambrianou and Ronnie Bender helped clear up the evidence of this crime, and attempted to assist in the disposal of the body. With McVitie's corpse being too big to fit in the boot of the car, it was wrapped in an eiderdown and put in the back seat. Tony Lambrianou drove the car with the body and Chris Lambrianou and Bender followed behind. Crossing the Blackwall tunnel, Chris lost Tony's car and spent up to 15 minutes looking around Rotherhithe area. They found Tony, outside St Mary's Church, where he had run out of fuel, McVitie's body still inside the car. The body was left in the car and the three gangsters returned home. Bender then went on to phone Charlie Kray informing them that it had been dealt with. When the Krays heard where they had left McVitie's corpse, the twins were livid and desperately phoned Foreman, who was then running a pub in Southwark, to see if he could dispose of the body. With dawn breaking, Foreman found the car, broke into it and drove the body to Newhaven where, with the help of a trawlerman, the body was bound with chicken wire and dumped in the English Channel. This event started turning many people against the Krays, and some were prepared to testify to Scotland Yard as to what had happened, fearing that what happened to McVitie could easily happen to them.

 Arrest, prosecution and imprisonment 

Detective Chief Superintendent Leonard "Nipper" Read of Scotland Yard was promoted to the Murder Squad and his first assignment was to bring down the Kray twins. During the first half of 1964, Read had been investigating their activities but publicity and official denials of Ron's relationship with Boothby made the evidence that he collected useless. Read went after the twins again in 1967 but frequently came up against the East End "wall of silence" which discouraged anyone from providing information to the police. They were represented in court by Nemone Lethbridge.

By the end of 1967 Read had built up enough evidence against the Krays. Early in 1968, the Krays employed Alan Bruce Cooper who sent Paul Elvey to Glasgow to buy explosives for a car bomb. Elvey was a radio engineer who put Radio Sutch on the air in 1964, later renamed Radio City. After police detained him in Scotland, he confessed to being involved in three murder attempts. The evidence was weakened by Cooper, who claimed that he was an agent for the US Treasury Department investigating links between the American Mafia and the Kray gang. The attempted murders were his attempt to put the blame on the Krays.

Eventually Scotland Yard decided to arrest the Krays on the evidence already collected, in the hope that other witnesses would be forthcoming once the Krays were in custody. On 8 May 1968 the Krays and 15 other members of the Firm were arrested. Exceptional measures were used to stop collusion between the accused. Nipper Read then secretly interviewed each of the arrested and offered each member of the Firm a deal if they testified against the others. Donoghue told the twins directly that he was not prepared to be cajoled into pleading guilty, to the anger of the twins. He then informed Read via his mother that he was ready to cooperate.

Ronnie Hart had initially not been arrested, and was not a name initially sought after by the police. With Donoghue's testimony, Hart was arrested. Offered the same terms as the others, Hart then told Read everything that had happened during McVitie's murder, although he did not know anything about what happened to the body. Although Read knew for certain that Ronnie Kray had murdered George Cornell in the Blind Beggar pub no one had been prepared to testify against the twins out of fear. Upon finding out the twins intended to cajole him, 'Scotch Jack' Dickson also turned in everything he knew about Cornell's murder. Although not a witness to the murder he was an accessory, having driven Ronnie Kray and Ian Barrie to the pub. The police still needed a witness to the murder. Frank Mitchell's escape and disappearance were much harder to obtain evidence for, since the majority of those arrested were not involved with his planned escape and disappearance.

The twins' defence under their counsel John Platts-Mills, QC, consisted of flat denials of all charges and discrediting witnesses by pointing out their criminal past. Justice Melford Stevenson said "In my view, society has earned a rest from your activities". The trial, which lasted from January to March 1969, was a media sensation. Such was the demand to attend the trial in the public gallery section of the courthouse that a black market emerged for seats with the price being £5 pounds per day for a seat in the public gallery.  It was the longest murder hearing in the history of British criminal justice, during which Justice Melford Stevenson stated of the sentences "I recommend [they] should not be less than thirty years". In March 1969, both were sentenced to life imprisonment, with a non-parole period of 30 years for the murders of Cornell and McVitie. Their brother Charlie was imprisoned for ten years for his part in the murders.

 Later years 
Ronnie and Reggie Kray were allowed, under a large police guard, to attend the funeral service of their mother Violet on 11 August 1982, following her death from cancer a week earlier. They were not allowed to attend her burial in the Kray family plot at Chingford Mount Cemetery. The funeral was attended by celebrities including Diana Dors and underworld figures known to the Krays. To avoid the publicity that had surrounded their mother's funeral, the twins did not ask for permission to attend their father's funeral in March 1983.

Ronnie Kray was a Category A prisoner, denied almost all liberties and not allowed to mix with other prisoners. He was eventually certified insane, his paranoid schizophrenia being tempered with constant medication; in 1979 he was committed and lived the remainder of his life in Broadmoor Hospital in Crowthorne, Berkshire. Reggie Kray was locked up in Maidstone Prison for eight years (Category B). In 1997, he was transferred to the Category C Wayland Prison in Norfolk.

In 1985 officials at Broadmoor Hospital discovered a business card of Ronnie's that led to evidence that the twins, from separate institutions, were operating Krayleigh Enterprises (a "lucrative bodyguard and 'protection' business for Hollywood stars") together with their older brother Charlie Kray and an accomplice at large. Among their clients was Frank Sinatra, who hired 18 bodyguards from Krayleigh Enterprises on his visit to the 1985 Wimbledon Championships. Documents released under Freedom of Information laws revealed that although officials were concerned about this operation, they believed that there was no legal basis to shut it down.

 Personal lives 

 Ronnie 
In his book My Story and a comment to writer Robin McGibbon on The Kray Tapes, Ronnie stated: "I'm bisexual, not homosexual. Bisexual." In the 1960s, he also planned to marry a woman named Monica whom he had dated for nearly three years. He called her "the most beautiful woman he had ever seen."  This is mentioned in Reggie's book Born Fighter. Also, extracts are mentioned in Ron's own book My Story and in Kate Kray's books Sorted; Murder, Madness and Marriage, and Free at Last.

Ronnie was arrested before he had the chance to marry Monica, and although she married his ex-boyfriend, 59 letters sent to her between May and December 1968 when he was imprisoned show Ronnie still had feelings for her, and his love for her was very clear. He referred to her as "my little angel" and "my little doll". She also still had feelings for Ronnie. These letters were auctioned in 2010.

A letter Ronnie sent to his mother Violet from prison in 1968 also refers to Monica: "if they let me see Monica and put me with Reg, I could not ask for more." He went on to say, "Monica is the only girl I have liked in my life. She is a lovely little person as you know. When you see her, tell her I am in love with her more than ever." Ronnie subsequently married twice, marrying Elaine Mildener in 1985 at Broadmoor chapel before the couple divorced in 1989, following which he married Kate Howard, whom he divorced in 1994. Kate Howard lived for a number of years in Headcorn Kent, in Forge Lane.

In an interview with author John Pearson, Ronnie indicated he identified with the 19th-century soldier Charles George Gordon: "Gordon was like me, homosexual, and he met his death like a man. When it's time for me to go, I hope I do the same."

In his biography of the twins, The Profession of Violence, Pearson claims that Ronnie Kray admitted that he and Reggie discovered they were both gay in their adolescence and would often have sex together, an activity which continued into their later life.

 Reggie 
Reggie married Frances Shea in 1965; she committed suicide two years later. In 1997 Reggie married Roberta Jones, whom he met while still in prison. She was helping to publicise a film she was making about Ronnie, who had died in hospital two years earlier.

 Controversies 
There was a long-running campaign, with some minor celebrity support, to have the twins released from prison, but successive Home Secretaries vetoed the idea, largely on the grounds that both Krays' prison records were marred by violence toward other inmates. The campaign gathered momentum after the release of a film based on their lives called The Krays (1990). Produced by Ray Burdis, it starred Spandau Ballet brothers Martin and Gary Kemp, who played the roles of Reggie and Ronnie respectively. Ronnie, Reggie and Charlie Kray received £255,000 for the film.

Reggie wrote: "I seem to have walked a double path most of my life. Perhaps an extra step in one of those directions might have seen me celebrated rather than notorious." Others point to Reggie's violent prison record when he was being detained separately from Ronnie and argue that in reality, the twins' temperaments were little different.

Reggie's marriage to Frances Shea (1943–1967) in 1965 lasted eight months when she left, although the marriage was never formally dissolved. An inquest came to the conclusion that she had committed suicide, but in 2002 an ex-lover of Reggie Kray's came forward to allege that Frances was murdered by a jealous Ronnie. Bradley Allardyce spent three years in Maidstone Prison with Reggie and explained, "I was sitting in my cell with Reg and it was one of those nights where we turned the lights down low and put some nice music on and sometimes he would reminisce. He would get really deep and open up to me. He suddenly broke down and said 'I'm going to tell you something I've only ever told two people and something I've carried around with me' – something that had been a black hole since the day he found out. He put his head on my shoulder and told me Ronnie killed Frances. He told Reggie what he had done two days after."

A television documentary, The Gangster and the Pervert Peer (2009), claimed that Ronnie Kray was a rapist of men. The programme also detailed his relationship with Conservative peer Bob Boothby as well as a Daily Mirror investigation into Lord Boothby's dealings with the Kray brothers.

The Kray legend
Jenks and Lorentzen argued that the Krays have entered the realm of a popular myth. The definition of 'myth' used by Jenks and Lorentzen is that formulated by Peter Burke in a 1989 essay "History as a Social Memory", where he defined a 'myth' as: "I am incidentally, using that slippery term 'myth' not in the positivist sense of 'inaccurate history', but in the richer, more positive sense of a story with symbolic meanings, made up of stereotyped incidents and involving characters who are larger than life, whether they are heroes or villains'". Jenks and Lorentzen argued the Krays have become the embodiment of "a particular version of East End history" and as a symbol of a "dark criminal past" associated with the East End.

The relative rarity of identical twins made the Krays stand out as there were numerous other gangster brother teams in the East End in the 1950s–1960s such as the Richardson brothers, the Nash brothers, the Dixon brothers, the Wood brothers, the Malone brothers, the Webb brothers and the Lambrianou brothers, but only the Krays live on in popular memory with the rest forgotten. The fame/infamy of the Krays is such that as Jenks and Loretzen noted that even today a "vast number" of East Enders "continue to claim an association with the Twins or their family (often despite impossible biographical or temporal discrepancies)". Jenks and Lorentzen argued the Krays have become a 'myth' because in the popular memory the Krays have "became a distillation of the violence, the horror, and the misery that the cultural compass of the East End has meant to the conventional moral order".

The American scholar Homer Pettey noted that there have been more films made about the Krays than other British gangsters. Pettey argued that popularity of the Krays as cinematic subjects reflected the image of the twins as the embodiment of the "dark sides of British national identity", as symbols of a streak of national perversity, ferocity and cruelty that stands in marked contrast to the normal positive images of the national identity of Britain presented in films. Pettey wrote "To extrapolate from their careers elements of British national identity, however, is not so far-fetched as it might seem. The Kray twins not only cultivated these popular cultural icons of their era, but they also wanted to become media icons...These sadistic twins initiated and accepted media practices that re-presented, re-mythologized and re-contextualized their lives". However, the fact that the Krays' criminal career came to an end with their convictions in 1969 allows their story, however unsavory and unpleasant it might be, to be presented on a reassuring note as the forces of law-and-order finally did triumph.

Part of the appeal of the legend of the Krays is that their story ended with the "dark side" of life that they represented being vanished. Pettey wrote: "In general, twins' lives fascinate because of their rarity in culture; their singularity forms the stuff of foundational myths, and lends itself to speculations about repetition, dualities and paradoxes. For Ron and Reggie Kray, local East End and London media lore hinted at two personalities, the gangster and the gentleman, the schizophrenic sadist and the clear-headed businessman, and the promiscuous homosexual and the monogamous married man.".

 Deaths 
Ronnie died on 17 March 1995 at the age of 61 at Wexham Park Hospital in Slough, Berkshire. He had suffered a heart attack at Broadmoor Hospital two days earlier. Reggie was allowed out of prison in handcuffs to attend the funeral.

Reggie died from terminal cancer after being released from prison on compassionate grounds aged 66 on 1 October 2000. During his incarceration, Reggie Kray became a born-again Christian. He was freed from Wayland on 26 August 2000 on compassionate grounds, on the direction of Home Secretary Jack Straw. He had been diagnosed with bladder cancer earlier that year, and the illness had been declared as terminal. The final weeks of his life were spent with his wife of three years, Roberta, in a suite at the Townhouse Hotel at Norwich, after he left the Norfolk and Norwich Hospital on 22 September 2000. Ten days after his death he was buried beside his brother Ronnie in Chingford Mount Cemetery. During the funeral, crowds of thousands lined up to applaud.

Charlie Kray, Ronnie and Reggie's older brother, was released from prison in 1975, after serving seven years of his 10-year sentence for his role in their gangland crimes. Charlie was sentenced to 12 years' imprisonment in 1997 for conspiracy to smuggle cocaine in an undercover drug sting. He died in prison of natural causes on 4 April 2000, aged 72, with Reggie allowed out of prison to attend his older brother's funeral.

 Media 

The Kray twins have seeded an extensive bibliography leading to many autobiographical accounts, biographical reconstructions, commentaries, analysis, fiction and speculation.

 Film 
 The Krays (1990), film biopic starring Spandau Ballet's Gary Kemp as Ronnie and Martin Kemp as Reggie.
 Legend (2015), a biopic starring Tom Hardy as both Ronnie and Reggie
 The Rise of the Krays (2015), a low budget film starring Simon Cotton as Ronnie and Kevin Leslie as Reggie
 The Fall of the Krays (2016), a low budget sequel to the earlier 2015 film, again starring Simon Cotton as Ronnie and Kevin Leslie as Reggie
 Code of Silence (2021), focusing on Leonard "Nipper" Read's final effort to get the Kray brothers convicted, starring Ronan Summers as both Ronnie and Reggie.
In addition to films explicitly about the twins, James Fox met Ronnie whilst the twins were held at HM Prison Brixton as part of his research for his role in the 1970 film Performance, and Richard Burton visited Ronnie at Broadmoor as part of his preparation for his role as a violent gangster in the 1971 film Villain.

 Literature 
  Biography 
  Biography
  autobiography 
  autobiography 
  autobiography 
  Autobiography of Reggie Kray 
  autobiography of the Kray twins 

Theatre

Two plays were produced in the 1970s that were based on thinly-veiled versions of the Krays:
 Alpha Alpha, by Howard Barker in 1972
 England England'', a musical by Snoo Wilson with music by Kevin Coyne and directed by Dusty Hughes in 1977, starring Bob Hoskins and Brian Hall in the lead roles.

Books and articles

References

External links 
 The Kray Twins: Brothers In Arms at the Crime Library
 Krays BBC TV interview (1965)
 BBC: On this day...1969: Kray twins guilty of McVitie murder, Richard Whitmore's BBC report on the Kray murder trial
 
 
 "200 years of The Krays' Family History" from Time Detectives

 
1933 births
British identical twins
English gangsters
English male boxers
English memoirists
English people convicted of murder
English prisoners sentenced to life imprisonment
20th-century English criminals
1960s crimes in London
20th-century English non-fiction writers
20th century in London
Criminal duos
Criminals from London
London crime history
Organised crime gangs of London
People convicted of murder by England and Wales
Prisoners in the Tower of London
Prisoners sentenced to life imprisonment by England and Wales
20th-century deaths
Identical twins
English twins
People from Bethnal Green
People from Hoxton
Crime families
Boxers from Greater London
Burials at Chingford Mount Cemetery
History of the Metropolitan Police
Military personnel from London
Royal Fusiliers soldiers